Paul Morrison (born 1944) is a British film director, screenwriter and psychotherapist.

Paul made his first film as a schoolboy when, after exams, he bunked off with a group of friends and shot on Super 8 a Keystone Cops inspired silent comedy, The Doubry Film. It remains his most joyous experience as a filmmaker.

At Cambridge he tried acting but found he was more suited to directing. He directed a number of plays and short plays, including Pinter’s The Birthday Party with Robert Cushman as Goldberg.

He graduated with a first in Economics and afterwards attended the Royal College of Art Film School on their one-year course 1966-7.

The following year he accepted a Kennedy Scholarship to Harvard Graduate School to study the Sociology of Underdevelopment. While there he became a part-time projectionist with the Ivy Film Club, thus able to view and analyse films overnight before they had to be returned. He worked with Josh Waletzky on a drama film about a rent strike, and with Morgan Fisher on several highly regarded conceptual films, including The Director and His Actor Look at Footage...

He returned to London and landed a job with the BBC, making short films for the nightly current affairs programme 24 Hours. He graduated onto longer pieces, working with a young John Humphries on an expose of conditions at Ashford remand centre. He made a series of films with Kenneth Allsop on ecological issues. He employed the first black presenter to make a film exposing the systematic undervaluing of black children’s scholastic ability.

In 1969 he made a fly on the wall documentary with John Lennon and Yoko Ono that was transmitted to coincide with the launch of their War is Over/Give Peace a Chance poster campaign.  That film was later honoured by Broadcast Magazine as one of the great moments in the first fifty years of television. It has recently been reissued on Amazon Prime in the USA.

In 1970 he dropped out of the BBC and went to work with a Community Arts Project, Inter-Action, where he led the films division. He encouraged young people and community groups to make their own films, using the newly available portable Sony and Akai cameras. He also made experimental participatory films with the actor, comic and mime Geoff Hoyle.

While still at Inter-Action, Paul was sought out by producer Irving Teitelbaum from Kestrel Films. He proceeded to direct several sponsored films for Kestrel, notably Like Other People about sexuality and disability, which went on to win the Grierson Award for best UK documentary in 1972. It was shown twice on the BBC in the Man Alive slot and became a touchstone for the emerging disability movement.

At Inter-Action the tragic death of a colleague forced Paul to face his own difficult feelings. It led him for the first time to seek psychotherapy and to learn its deep and lasting value.

Paul left Inter-Action and became a founder member of the Newsreel Collective, helping make campaign and educational films, including Divide and Rule – Never! against racism, and True Romance etc. about relationships and sexual preference. The script for the latter was workshopped with the young people who performed in it. Divide and Rule – Never! won first prize at Oberhausen. True Romance etc! was runner-up for the Grierson award.

During the same period, Paul was deeply engaged in the nascent men’s movement, which looked to redefine men’s roles in response to women’s liberation. He published a volume of poems celebrating and exploring the birth of his daughter, Pregnant Fatherhood. He also wrote for and helped to produce Achilles Heel, a radical men’s magazine.

With the advent of Channel Four, Paul was able to direct three documentary series close to his heart.

About Men… explored issues of masculinity via a group of Coventry men. They came together once a week with the filmmakers to examine their preconceptions of what it was to be a man.

A Change of Mind opened up the world of psychotherapy. It included moving sequences of therapeutic sessions filmed live. It subversively mixed old and newer schools of psychotherapy.

A Sense of Belonging was about the dilemmas of British Jewish identity. It put on the screen dozens of ordinary and extraordinary Jews who had previously been invisible, and asked how this came about. This series was produced through APT Film and Television, which Paul founded with Andy Porter and Tony Dowmunt.

In this period, he also made for the BBC the feature documentary From Bitter Earth: Artists of the Holocaust. It told the story of the artists who bore witness, at risk of death, to the ghettoes and death camps of World War II.

Paul then looked to write and direct his first fiction feature film, which became Solomon & Gaenor, a Welsh-Jewish love story set amid the anti-Jewish riots in the Welsh valleys in 1911. During the extended period of fund-raising for the film, Paul completed his modular training at Spectrum Centre for Humanistic and Integrative Psychotherapy and began to practice as a therapist.

Solomon & Gaenor starred Ioan Gruffud and Nia Roberts It was shot in 1998, released in 1999, won numerous festival prizes, and was nominated for an Academy award in the Foreign Language category in 2000.

His next film, Wondrous Oblivion, a coming-of age dramedy, told the story of a Jewish kid who loves cricket but requires the support and coaching of his Afro-/Caribbean neighbours to be half-way good at it. Featuring Delroy Lindo as Dennis, the next door neighbour, it explored the endemic racism of the early sixties, with the Jewish family awkwardly perched between the Jamaican family and the hostile residents of the street. In 2003 it opened the Berlin Kinderfilmfest. Paul also wrote the novelisation of the film, published in the same year.

In 2007 Paul shot Little Ashes, written by Philippa Goslett. It told the true but controversial story of the thwarted love affair between Salvador Dali and Federico Lorca, in which Luis Bunuel became the jealous saboteur. Robert Pattinson played Dali, Javier Beltran Lorca, and Matthew Macnulty Bunuel. It was shot in Barcelona and Cadaques and won Best Feature at the GLAAD awards.

For the next ten years, Paul maintained his therapy practice and was otherwise caught up in family care which precluded making movies. In 2018 he retired as a psychotherapist.

In 2019 Paul returned to filmmaking. He wrote and directed 23 Walks, an older person’s dog walking love story, starring Alison Steadman and Dave Johns. It was released in 2020.

He currently has two films in active development, Windermere, about a group of 1970s political activists who re-unite post-pandemic in a house on the famous lake. And The Leningrad Gig, a rock and roll journey of return which tells the (mostly) true story of a road trip he took in 1964 to Ukraine and the USSR to recover his roots.

Solomon and Gaenor (1999)
Wondrous Oblivion (2003)
Little Ashes (2008)
23 Walks (2020)

References

External links

Met Film Production
The Official Little Ashes website

British male screenwriters
1944 births
Living people